Carl Boy (born 2 July 1899, date of death unknown) was a Jamaican cricketer. He played in two first-class matches for the Jamaican cricket team in 1931/32 and 1935/36.

See also
 List of Jamaican representative cricketers

References

External links
 

1899 births
Year of death missing
Jamaican cricketers
Jamaica cricketers
Sportspeople from Kingston, Jamaica